Ambition Mountain is a mountain in British Columbia, Canada, located  east of the Stikine River and  northwest of Scud Peak.

References

Two-thousanders of British Columbia
Cassiar Land District